Rubahqan (also Romanized as Rūbahqān and Rūbehqān; also known as Roobahghan) is a village in Dehqanan Rural District, in the Central District of Kharameh County, Fars Province, Iran. During the 2006 census, its population was 714, in 168 families.

References 

Populated places in Kharameh County